Nine Lives may refer to the common myth that cats have nine lives.

Nine Lives or 9 Lives may also refer to:

Arts, entertainment, and media

Films 
Nine Lives (1957 film), or Ni Liv, a Norwegian film
Nine Lives (2002 film), a horror film
Unstoppable (2004 film), an American action film also released under the title Nine Lives
Nine Lives (2005 film), an American drama film
Nine Lives (2016 film), a French comedy film

Literature 
"Nine Lives" (novelette), 1969 science fiction novelette by Ursula K. Le Guin
Nine Lives, 1959 autobiography of the Battle of Britain pilot Alan Christopher Deere
Batman: Nine Lives, a 1992 graphic novel
Garfield: His 9 Lives, a 1984 collection of illustrated short stories 
Nine Lives: In Search of the Sacred in Modern India, a 2009 travel book by William Dalrymple
The 9 Lives (manga), an Original English-language manga

Music

Albums 
9 Lives (AZ album), 2001
9 Lives (Kat DeLuna album), 2007 
9 Lives (Pandora album), 2003
Nine Lives (Aerosmith album), 1997
Nine Lives (Deuce album), 2012
Nine Lives (Last Autumn's Dream album), 2012
Nine Lives (Robert Plant album), 2006
Nine Lives (Bonnie Raitt album), 1986
Nine Lives (REO Speedwagon album), 1979
Nine Lives (Steve Winwood album), 2008
Nine Lives (Von Hertzen Brothers album), 2013

Songs 
"9 Lives" (Alexandra Stan song), 2017
"Nine Lives" (Aerosmith song), 1997
"Nine Lives", by Def Leppard from Songs from the Sparkle Lounge (2008)
"Nine Lives", by Edguy from Tinnitus Sanctus (2008)
"Nine Lives", by Black Grape from Pop Voodoo (2017)

Television
"9 Lives", an episode of television series Psych
"Nine Lives", an episode of the first season of Kung Fu

Other uses
 9 lives, a line of Eveready batteries
9Lives, a pet food brand

See also 
9 (disambiguation)